Neobassia proceriflora, the soda bush, is a species of flowering plant in the family Amaranthaceae, native to central and eastern Australia. A small shrub, it is typically found growing in heavy soils.

References

Amaranthaceae
Endemic flora of Australia
Flora of the Northern Territory
Flora of South Australia
Flora of Queensland
Flora of New South Wales
Taxa named by Ferdinand von Mueller
Plants described in 1978